The 1994 Philippine Basketball Association (PBA) Governors Cup was the third conference of the 1994 PBA season. It started on September 27 and ended on December 18, 1994. The tournament had an import-laden format, requiring an import or a pure-foreign player for each team.

The two champions in the first two conferences were seeded in the semifinal round by virtue of San Miguel Beer representing the Philippine national team in the Hiroshima Asian Games and Commissioner's Cup champion Purefoods Tender Juicy Hotdogs lending three of its key players to the national quintet.

Format
The following format will be observed for the duration of the conference:
 Double-round robin eliminations among 6 teams; total of 10 games; teams are then seeded by basis on win–loss records.
 The top four teams qualified in the semifinal round along with the two-seeded teams in the semifinals; San Miguel Beer and Purefoods.
 Semifinals will be two round robin affairs with standings back to zero.
 The top two teams in the semifinals advance to the best-of-seven finals. The last two teams dispute the third-place trophy in a best-of-five playoff.

Elimination round

Team standings

Semifinal berth playoff

Semifinals

Team standings

Third place playoffs

Finals

References

External links
 PBA.ph

Governors' Cup
PBA Governors' Cup